Václav Tuhý was a Czech wrestler. He competed in the men's Greco-Roman lightweight at the 1948 Summer Olympics.

References

External links
 

Year of birth missing
Possibly living people
Czech male sport wrestlers
Olympic wrestlers of Czechoslovakia
Wrestlers at the 1948 Summer Olympics
Place of birth missing